Liu Jiren is the chairman and CEO of Neusoft Group, a large software company in China.

In 2019, Dr. Liu received Ernst & Young's EY Entrepreneur Of The Year Alumni Award for Societal Impact.

References

External links

Interview with Neusoft's Chairman & CEO, Dr Liu Jiren

Chinese computer scientists
Chinese chief executives
Living people
Chinese chairpersons of corporations
Businesspeople from Liaoning
People from Dandong
Educators from Liaoning
Academic staff of the Northeastern University (China)
Scientists from Liaoning
21st-century Chinese businesspeople
Year of birth missing (living people)